Nishisatsunai Dam  is a gravity dam located in Hokkaido Prefecture in Japan. The dam is used for flood control. The catchment area of the dam is 5.8 km2. The dam impounds about 18  ha of land when full and can store 946 thousand cubic meters of water. The construction of the dam was started on 1979 and completed in 1994.

References

Dams in Hokkaido